CCGS Siyay is a Canadian Coast Guard Type 400 BHC AP1-88/400 hovercraft based in Richmond, British Columbia. The vessel was ordered in 1996 and launched and entered service in 1998. The hovercraft is predominantly used for servicing navigational aids and search and rescue duties.

Description
Siyay is a Type 400 BHC AP1-88/400 hovercraft, the second of two vessels constructed for the Canadian Coast Guard.

The hovercraft is powered by four Caterpillar 3416 TTA diesel engines turning two controllable-pitch propellers creating . The vessel has a complement of 7 with two officers.

Construction and career
The contract to build Siyay and sister ship  was awarded in May 1996 to GKN Westland. The two hovercraft were built by Hike Metals & Shipbuilding Limited at their yard in Wheatley, Ontario. Siyay was launched in 1998 and completed in December of that year. At the time of construction, Siyay and Sipu Muin were the largest diesel-powered hovercraft in the world. The name Siyay is taken from the Salish word for friend. Siyay entered service in 1998 and is based at Richmond, British Columbia. Siyay is predominantly used for servicing navigational aids and search and rescue duties. The vessel is registered in Ottawa, Ontario.

In September 2014, Siyay underwent unscheduled maintenance, forcing the Canadian Coast Guard to redeploy other vessels to cover for the loss. However, by the end of the month, Siyay was back in service, rescuing seven people from a sinking fishing boat off the coast of British Columbia. In 2015, Siyay was taken out of service for a refit at the Seaspan shipyard, returning to operations in May 2016.

See also
 List of equipment of the Canadian Coast Guard

Notes

Citations

References
  
 
 

Hovercraft of the Canadian Coast Guard
Ships built in Ontario
1998 ships
Richmond, British Columbia
Ships of the Canadian Coast Guard